Daniel Lomas may refer to:

Daniel Lomas, actor in Torched (film)
Daniel Lomas, character in Silk (TV series)
Daniel Lomas, vocalist in Nazxul